A refractometer is a laboratory or field device for the measurement of an index of refraction (refractometry).  The index of refraction is calculated from the observed refraction angle using Snell's law. For mixtures, the index of refraction then allows to determine the concentration using mixing rules such as the Gladstone–Dale relation and Lorentz–Lorenz equation.

Refractometry 
Standard refractometers measure the extent of light refraction (as part of a refractive index) of transparent substances in either a liquid or solid-state; this is then used in order to identify a liquid sample, analyze the sample's purity, and determine the amount or concentration of dissolved substances within the sample. As light passes through the liquid from the air it will slow down and create a ‘bending’ illusion, the severity of the ‘bend’ will depend on the amount of substance dissolved in the liquid. For example, the amount of sugar in a glass of water.

Types 

There are four main types of refractometers: traditional handheld refractometers, digital handheld refractometers, laboratory or Abbe refractometers (named for the instrument's inventor and based on Ernst Abbe's original design of the 'critical angle') and inline process refractometers. There is also the Rayleigh Refractometer used (typically) for measuring the refractive indices of gases.

In laboratory medicine, a refractometer is used to measure the total plasma protein in a blood sample and urine specific gravity in a urine sample.

In drug diagnostics, a refractometer is used to measure the specific gravity of human urine.

In gemology, the gemstone refractometer is one of the fundamental pieces of equipment used in a gemological laboratory. Gemstones are transparent minerals and can therefore be examined using optical methods. Refractive index is a material constant, dependent on the chemical composition of a substance. The refractometer is used to help identify gem materials by measuring their refractive index, one of the principal properties used in determining the type of a gemstone. Due to the dependence of the refractive index on the wavelength of the light used (i.e. dispersion), the measurement is normally taken at the wavelength of the sodium line D-line (NaD) of ~589 nm. This is either filtered out from daylight or generated with a monochromatic light-emitting diode (LED). Certain stones such as rubies, sapphires, tourmalines and topaz are optically anisotropic. They demonstrate birefringence based on the polarisation plane of the light. The two different refractive indexes are classified using a polarisation filter. Gemstone refractometers are available both as classic optical instruments and as electronic measurement devices with a digital display.

In marine aquarium keeping, a refractometer is used to measure the salinity and specific gravity of the water.

In the automobile industry, a refractometer is used to measure the coolant concentration.

In the machine industry, a refractometer is used to measure the amount of coolant concentrate that has been added to the water-based coolant for the machining process.

In homebrewing, a brewing refractometer is used to measure the specific gravity before fermentation to determine the amount of fermentable sugars which will potentially be converted to alcohol.

Brix refractometers are often used by hobbyists for making preserves including jams, marmalades and honey. In beekeeping, a brix refractometer is used to measure the amount of water in honey.

Automatic 

Automatic refractometers automatically measure the refractive index of a sample. The automatic measurement of the refractive index of the sample is based on the determination of the critical angle of total reflection.
A light source, usually a long-life LED, is focused onto a prism surface via a lens system. An interference filter guarantees the specified wavelength. Due to focusing light to a spot at the prism surface, a wide range of different angles is covered.
As shown in the figure "Schematic setup of an automatic refractometer" the measured sample is in direct contact with the measuring prism. Depending on its refractive index, the incoming light below the critical angle of total reflection is partly transmitted into the sample, whereas for higher angles of incidence the light is totally reflected. This dependence of the reflected light intensity from the incident angle is measured with a high-resolution sensor array. From the video signal taken with the CCD sensor the refractive index of the sample can be calculated.
This method of detecting the angle of total reflection is independent on the sample properties. It is even possible to measure the refractive index of optically dense strongly absorbing samples or samples containing air bubbles or solid particles . Furthermore, only a few microliters are required and the sample can be recovered. This determination of the refraction angle is independent of vibrations and other environmental disturbances.

Influence of wavelength 

The refractive index of a given sample varies with wavelength for all materials. This dispersion relation is nonlinear and is characteristic for every material. In the visible range, a decrease of the refractive index comes with increasing wavelength. In glass prisms very little absorption is observable. In the infrared wavelength range several absorption maxima and fluctuations in the refractive index appear. To guarantee a high quality measurement with an accuracy of up to 0.00002 in the refractive index the wavelength has to be determined correctly. Therefore, in modern refractometers the wavelength is tuned to a bandwidth of +/-0.2 nm to ensure correct results for samples with different dispersions.

Influence of temperature 

Temperature has a very important influence on the refractive index measurement. Therefore, the temperature of the prism and the temperature of the sample have to be controlled with high precision. There are several subtly-different designs for controlling the temperature; but there are some key factors common to all, such as high-precision temperature sensors and Peltier devices to control the temperature of the sample and the prism. The temperature control of these devices should be designed so that the variation in sample temperature is small enough that it will not cause a detectable refractive-index change.

External water baths were used in the past but are no longer needed.

Extended possibilities of automatic refractometers 

Automatic refractometers are microprocessor-controlled electronic devices. This means they can have a high degree of automation and also be combined with other measuring devices

Flow cells 
There are different types of sample cells available, ranging from a flow cell for a few microliters to sample cells with a filling funnel for fast sample exchange without cleaning the measuring prism in between. The sample cells can also be used for the measurement of poisonous and toxic samples with minimum exposure to the sample.
Micro cells require only a few microliters volume, assure good recovery of expensive samples and prevent evaporation of volatile samples or solvents. They can also be used in automated systems for automatic filling of the sample onto the refractometer prism.
For convenient filling of the sample through a funnel, flow cells with a filling funnel are available.  These are used for fast sample exchange in quality control applications.

Automatic sample feeding 

Once an automatic refractometer is equipped with a flow cell, the sample can either be filled by means of a syringe or by using a peristaltic pump. Modern refractometers have the option of a built-in peristaltic pump. This is controlled via the instrument's software menu. A peristaltic pump opens the way to monitor batch processes in the laboratory or perform multiple measurements on one sample without any user interaction. This eliminates human error and assures a high sample throughput.

If an automated measurement of a large number of samples is required, modern automatic refractometers can be combined with an automatic sample changer. The sample changer is controlled by the refractometer and assures fully automated measurements of the samples placed in the vials of the sample changer for measurements.

Multiparameter measurements 

Today's laboratories do not only want to measure the refractive index of samples, but several additional parameters like density or viscosity to perform efficient quality control. Due to the microprocessor control and a number of interfaces, automatic refractometers are able to communicate with computers or other measuring devices, e.g. density meters, pH meters or viscosity meters, to store refractive index data and density data (and other parameters) into one database.

Software features 
Automatic refractometers do not only measure the refractive index, but offer a lot of additional software features, like
 Instrument settings and configuration via software menu
 Automatic data recording into a database
 User-configurable data output
 Export of measuring data into Microsoft Excel data sheets
 Statistical functions
 Predefined methods for different kinds of applications
 Automatic checks and adjustments
 Check if sufficient amount of sample is on the prism
 Data recording only if the results are plausible

Pharma documentation and validation 

Refractometers are often used in pharmaceutical applications for quality control of raw intermediate and final products. The manufacturers of pharmaceuticals have to follow several international regulations like FDA 21 CFR Part 11, GMP, Gamp 5, USP<1058>, which require a lot of documentation work. The manufacturers of automatic refractometers support these users providing instrument software fulfills the requirements of 21 CFR Part 11, with user levels, electronic signature and audit trail. Furthermore, Pharma Validation and Qualification Packages are available containing
 Qualification Plan (QP)
 Design Qualification (DQ)
 Risk Analysis
 Installation Qualification (IQ)
 Operational Qualification (OQ)
 Check List 21 CFR Part 11 / SOP
 Performance Qualification (PQ)

Scales typically used 
 Brix
 Oechsle scale
 Plato scale
 Baumé scale

See also 

 Ernst Abbe
 Refractive index
 Gemology
 Must weight
 Winemaking
 Harvest (wine)
 Gravity (beer)
 High-fructose corn syrup
 Cutting fluid
 German inventors and discoverers
 High refractive index polymers

References

Further reading

External links 
 Refractometer – Gemstone Buzz  uses, procedure & limitations.
 Rayleigh Refractometer: Operational Principles 
 Refractometers and refractometry explains how refractometers work.

 
Measuring instruments
Scales
Beekeeping tools
Food science